Anna Polak may refer to:

Anna Dresden-Polak (1906–1943), Dutch gymnast
Anna Sophia Polak (1874–1943), Dutch feminist and author